Adam Howden (born 1 July) is an English actor who has worked in video games, television, theatre, film, and audiobooks.

In video games, his most notable roles are as Shulk in the Xenoblade Chronicles games and the Super Smash Bros. series, as Anders in Dragon Age II, as Tintin for the video game based on the film, The Adventures of Tintin, as Pipin in the Final Fantasy XIV expansion pack Final Fantasy XIV: Heavensward, and as Fenton Paddock in the point-and-click adventure game Lost Horizon. Regarding television, Howden has acted as a guest star on the BBC One soap opera Doctors as Martin Rivers (2008), Ben Hardwick (2013), and DC Gerrard Norcroft (2015), performances as Steven Lilwall on the BBC One series New Tricks, and two roles, as Fred and Jack Parsons, for the TV series documentary Dark Matters: Twisted But True on Science Channel. In theatre, he has worked on various plays, most notably in 2015 in the role of Stu for a revival of Anthony Neilson's play Stitching at the House of Wolf, and also the role of Dickie Greenleaf for the play adaptation of Patricia Highsmith's The Talented Mr. Ripley at New Diorama Theatre, for which Howden received a Best Supporting Male nomination at the 2016 Off West End Theatre Awards.
In the film, Howden has played main roles in short films like Towers by the filmmaker Azhur Saleem, but also small parts in films like Delicious and Rupert Drummond in the horror film Scar Tissue. Howden also performed narration on the audiobook for Wicked Beloved, a novel by Susanne Saville.

Acting bug and education
Howden was fond of acting since his early school years. He chose the subject for his GCSE studies, then his A Levels at the Strode College in 1999. He studied Drama, Film Studies, and English Literature until his 2001 graduation.

Howden went on to audition at drama schools for further experience. Eventually, he was accepted at the Drama Centre, a location he appreciated for its welcoming atmosphere and its rich acting pedigree (e.g. Colin Firth, Michael Fassbender). He studied alongside other alumni such as Ryan Gage, Rolan Bell, Gwendoline Christie, Jodie McNee, and Joseph MacNab. Howden studied multiple acting techniques, including some involving his voice. As he explains, "working on your voice is very important in all areas of acting, not just voice-overs."

Voice-over beginnings
Following his 2005 graduation, Howden's first TV role was as a student during "Slow Bomb", the finale of the action series Ultimate Force. For that role, Howden took his breaks inside a trailer with Simon Lenagan, another guest-star. There, he discussed with Lenagan how he wanted to do voice-over, and Lenagan encouraged him to present his voice reel at Just Voices, a voice-over agency he had co-founded. 
Howden did so, which started his career in voice-overs, first doing commercials and corporate voice-overs. He moved on to video games, with additional voices in Dragon Age Origins and Dragon Age: Origins – Awakening, then as Fenton Paddock in Lost Horizon, a main role which Howden says he still has "a soft spot for".

Notable video game roles

BioWare games
His first roles in the video game industry were as a part of BioWare's Dragon Age franchise. He auditioned for Dragon Age: Origins at the voice studio Side UK, reading and obtaining a couple of roles.  Directed by Caroline Livingstone, Dragon Age's voice director, he recorded various voices such as the Ostagar prisoner, which Howden has said he was "quite fond of" and "the first time I'd ever seen myself as a computer sprite." For the Dragon Age: Origins – Awakening add-on, he voiced the Constable Aidan.

Howden's breakthrough came in 2011's Dragon Age 2  as Anders. Originally played by Greg Ellis in Dragon Age: Origins – Awakening, BioWare offered Howden the part when Ellis couldn't return for unspecified reasons. Howden recorded with the guidance of Caroline Livingstone, who advised him on Anders's progression, as voice actors do not receive a complete script for secrecy reasons, and checked over his voice tone. Howden listened to Greg Ellis's performance but "followed his instincts" and didn't copy it entirely, claiming that, due to narrative progression, the character "is written quite differently. He maintains a sense of humor but you learn so much more about him in DA2 and you see a much darker side to him."

Howden has stated that he is very proud to have been involved in those projects, praising their diverse storytelling opportunities and branching narration. He credits his role as Anders as a major factor in his rise in popularity, and has mentioned that it was the most frequent character fans asked him to pull out when meeting him. Concerning the controversy over Anders's actions in the game, Howden expressed his entire support for him, explaining that he was his actor and, as he learned at his acting lessons, actors must not judge their characters and must deal with their actions. On an episode of the MCMBuzz Podcast, Howden denounced the homophobia some fans exhibited over a gay romance storyline between Anders and Garrett Hawke, the hero of the game. Howden defended the storyline and denied the idea that playing a gay character was difficult for him, citing the fact that he has voiced gay characters before (e.g. Hanschen Rilow in Frank Wedekind's Spring Awakening).

Shulk (Xenoblade Chronicles and Super Smash Bros)
After a successful November 2010 audition for an unidentified Nintendo RPG, Howden was offered the role of Shulk, protagonist of the video game Xenoblade Chronicles from Monolith Soft. Already released in Japan for the Wii on 10 June 2010 and set in Europe for 19 August 2011, Howden's job was to participate in Xenoblade's English translation for the 2011 release. Thus, his recording, helmed by Justin Villier at Side UK, happened over four straight weeks—as opposed to the Dragon Age and Tintin recordings, which occurred in separate stages set according to their productions' situations.

Howden's performance had to correspond to the character's design and the casting director's desires: a bold and intelligent young adult who slowly becomes more mature during his quest, with, as Howden was told, "a neutral English voice, not posh sounding, but should sound educated." So Howden applied a tone which, as he says, "is not completely different from my own voice, it's a variation of my own voice. How I was when I was 19, probably!" To ensure his acting corresponded well to Tetsuya Takahashi's intentions, he listened to the Japanese voice track to match the emotion for each scene.
The recording team worked with a translator and Nintendo producer to create a faithful and expert localization of the storyline, adjusting the translation as issues arose. For instance, if a character's mouth animation didn't match with the voice actor's performance, the crew would either shorten or lengthen the dialogue while keeping fidelity with the original's intent. And if the crew had questions over certain lines or terms, the translator would help them.

Howden described it as "a philosophical game. It explores our place in the universe, do we really exist, God, do we make our own fate or are we on a set course, as well as love, revenge, and friendship." He stated that he was proud of Xenoblade and wished the game had gotten more recognition for its merits. His performance was applauded and the entire voice crew earned a "Best Vocal Ensemble in a Video Game" nomination in 2013 at the BTVA Video Game Voice Acting Award. Howden performed as Shulk again for the English version of Super Smash Bros. for Nintendo 3DS and Wii U, which released in October 2014 (Nintendo 3DS) and November 2014 (Wii U).

Howden returned for Xenoblade Chronicles X in 2015, where he plays the "Classic" male avatar voice (a nod to his role as Shulk), one of several voice styles available in the game's character creator. Howden also returned for Xenoblade Chronicles 2 in 2017 as the voice of the Architect and the Tantalese Knights, and also reprised his previous role as Shulk, made available as a recruitable crossover character in the game's Challenge Battle Mode DLC. Howden reprised Shulk once again for Xenoblade Chronicles: Future Connected, a new storyline added to the 2020 Definitive Edition port of the original game. In 2021, Howden reprised his role as Shulk for the ending sequence of Super Smash Bros. Ultimate Pyra and Mythra DLC reveal trailer. Howden will once again reprise his role as Shulk in the upcoming story DLC for Xenoblade Chronicles 3.

Tintin (The Adventures of Tintin: The Secret of the Unicorn)

When Side UK passed video game auditions for the hero's voice, Howden was excited at the idea of performing as Tintin, claiming to have been a fan of the comics from a young age. Although one audition employee expressed doubts that Howden would obtain the role, as the character is sixteen years old and Howden was in his late twenties, Howden obtained the role. This was his third time working with Phil Evans, who had voice-directed him on Lost Horizon and Star Wars: The Old Republic.

Howden described the game as a platformer inspired by Steven Spielberg and Peter Jackson's production, stating that "they've taken two of the Tintin books and combined them for the film, and the game sort of follows that story of the film, but will also go on other adventures as well, so that you can do other things."
Unlike Xenoblade Chronicles and Dragon Age where he recorded alone in the booth, Howden performed alongside other actors this time. Among them was Lewis MacLeod, who Howden described as "just so confident and he can just do it. He just turns it on, he can change his voice, turn on a sixpence, and it's brilliant."

Writing interests
Howden has expressed a love for writing stories, stating it's "a good way to stay sharp when I'm not acting." Among those projects came "Bin Men" and "Dogging", two 2011 comedic shorts he shot with Jamie Baughan, a Drama Centre colleague, and the director Sankar Jayaraman, who filmed him in 2010 on "Bubble Burst".

Howden has stated that he wishes to someday make a biographical film about his mother's family life in 1960s East Africa and play his grandfather. As he explains, "I've been told so many amazing stories of their time there and having visited there myself I want others to see what a beautiful place it is. It's all in my head, I just need to write the bugger."

Stage work

Filmography

Feature films and shorts

Video games

Television

Audiobooks

References

External links 

 
 
 MCM Buzz Podcast 21 (Adam's interview starts at 29:20 and finishes at 1:20:00)
 Adam Howden Nintendo Interview
 Adam Howden General Interview

Living people
English male film actors
English male voice actors
English male video game actors
English male television actors
English male stage actors
English republicans
Year of birth missing (living people)